Raymond E. Arvidson is the James S. McDonnell Distinguished Professor of Earth and Planetary Sciences at Washington University in St. Louis. He is known for his contributions to NASA missions to Mars, including as deputy director of the Mars Exploration Rovers.

Education and career 
Arvidson attended Williamstown High School in Williamstown, New Jersey, graduating in 1965. He earned a bachelor's degree in geology from Temple University in 1969, as well as his M.S. in 1971 and Ph.D. in 1975 from Brown University under the supervision of Thomas Mutch. He was the first person in his family to graduate from high school.

Arvidson became an assistant professor at Washington University in St. Louis in 1974 and received promotions to full professor in 1984 and to McDonnell Distinguished Professor in 1998. He has served as chair of the Earth and Planetary Sciences Department. Arvidson "has been instrumental in developing and implementing both orbital and landed missions to the planets." He has received three NASA Public Service Medals and the Whipple Award of the American Geophysical Union. He is a fellow of the Geological Society of America and the American Geophysical Union.

Minor planet 397278 is named after Arvidson.

Teaching and mentoring 
Arvidson has received a number of teaching and advising awards, including Advisor of the Year, Student Union Professor of the Year, and the Outstanding Graduate Faculty Member Award from Washington University, as well as the Missouri Governor's Award for Excellence in Teaching. He directed the Pathfinder Program in Environmental Sustainability at Washington University, which had many notable alumni.

References 

Planetary scientists
Exploration of Mars
People from Monroe Township, Middlesex County, New Jersey
Washington University in St. Louis faculty
Scientists from St. Louis
Scientists from New Jersey
American geologists
NASA people
Brown University alumni
Temple University alumni
Living people
Year of birth missing (living people)
20th-century American geologists